Kızılca is a Turkish place name and may refer to the following places in Turkey:

 Kızılca, Bozdoğan, a village in Bozdoğan district of Aydın Province
 Kızılca, Bozyazı, a village in Bozyazı district of Mersin Province
 Kızılca, Çubuk, a village in Çubuk district of Ankara Province
 Kızılca, Elmalı, a village in Elmalı district of Antalya Province
 Kızılca, Gümüşhacıköy, a village in Gümüşhacıköy district of Amasya Province
 Kızılca, Horasan
 Kızılca, Karakoçan
 Kızılca, Kızılcahamam, a village in Kızılcahamam district of Ankara Province
 Kızılca, Kurşunlu
 Kızılca, Sandıklı, a village in Sandıklı district of Afyonkarahisar Province
 Kızılca, Tavas
 Kızılca, Tercan